He Weidong (born May 1957) is a general (shangjiang) of the People's Liberation Army (PLA) who is currently a vice chairman of the Central Military Commission (second-ranked) and member of the 20th Politburo of the Chinese Communist Party. He served as commander of the Eastern Theater Command from 2019 to 2022. He was promoted to the rank of major general (shaojiang) in July 2008, lieutenant general (zhongjiang) in July 2017 and general (shangjiang) in December 2019.

Education
He was born in Nanping, Fujian, with ancestry was in the town of Xuhe, in Dongtai, Jiangsu in May 1957. In 1981 he graduated from PLA Nanjing Army Command College. In 2001 he entered the National University of Defense Technology.

Military career
He enlisted in the People's Liberation Army (PLA) in December 1972 after middle school. He was Commander of Jiangsu Military District in July 2013 and Shanghai Garrison in March 2014. In February 2015 he succeeded Zhu Shengling as a member of the Standing Committee of the CCP Shanghai Committee. In July 2016 he was transferred to Deputy Commander of the Western Theater Command and Commander of the Western Theater Command Ground Force. In September 2019 he was promoted to become Commander of the Eastern Theater Command, replacing Liu Yuejun.

He was a delegate to the 13th National People's Congress.

References

1957 births
Living people
People from Nanping
National University of Defense Technology alumni
People's Liberation Army generals from Fujian
People's Republic of China politicians from Fujian
Chinese Communist Party politicians from Fujian
Delegates to the 13th National People's Congress
Members of the 20th Politburo of the Chinese Communist Party